The R731 road is a regional road in County Wexford, Ireland. From its junction with the  R730 it takes a route along the southeasterly flank of the Blackstairs Mountains to its junction with the R729 north of New Ross, where it terminates. 

En route it passes through the villages of Killann, Rathnure and Ballywilliam.

See also
Roads in Ireland
National primary road
National secondary road

References
Roads Act 1993 (Classification of Regional Roads) Order 2006 – Department of Transport

Regional roads in the Republic of Ireland
Roads in County Wexford